The T class are a class of diesel locomotives built by Clyde Engineering, Granville for the Victorian Railways between 1955 and 1968.

History

In July 1954, the Victorian Railways placed an order with Clyde Engineering for 25 (later extended to 27) diesel electric Electro-Motive Diesel G8 locomotives to partially dieselise country branch lines.

In June 1959, the first of an additional ten entered service. Although mechanically similar to the first batch, they differed by having a cab raised above the hood line. A further ten entered service from December 1961.

In September 1965, the first of an order for 32 was delivered. These differed by having a lower nose. A final order for 19 was delivered from April 1967. The last five were built with an extra  of ballast weight for improved adhesion and low speed controls for use as shunting locomotives in Melbourne. These were reclassified as the H class shortly after being delivered.

In July 1969, an additional flat top unit was purchased second hand from Australian Portland Cement who had ordered it for use at its narrow gauge Fyansford Cement Works Railway, Geelong in 1956. Although outwardly similar to the original T class units, it was fitted with dynamic brakes, and became a regular on the steeply graded Cudgewa line.

Although ordered as branch line locomotives, as branch lines began to close, they were often used on main line services.

In 1984/85, Martin & King, Somerton rebuilt 13 flat tops as P class locomotives. This involved a new cab and carbody, replacing the EMD 8-567C engine with an EMD 8-645E, replacement of the main generator and traction motors, and provision of a separate head end power generator.

Many were withdrawn in the late 1980s with the arrival of the G class locomotives. In October 1992, six low nose locomotives were sold to Australian National with five entering service as the CK class as shunters and bankers in Adelaide. All were included in the sale of Australian National to Australian Southern Railroad in November 1997. One was resold to SCT Logistics with the remaining four operating on the narrow gauge Eyre Peninsula Railway as at January 2014.

Others were sold to Chicago Freight Car Leasing Australia, El Zorro, Great Northern Rail Services, SCT Logistics, Southern Shorthaul Railroad, and West Coast Railway. A number of the T class have been preserved.

Those remaining with V/Line Freight were included in the sale to Freight Australia and in 2000, some stored examples were reactivated and fitted with standard gauge bogies to haul grain services in southern New South Wales. These passed with the Freight Australia business to Pacific National in August 2004.

Subtypes
The class can be divided into three main styles by appearance:

 Flat tops: T320-T346 (first order). Based on Electro-Motive Diesel G8 locomotive design, this order had a low cab and roof.
 High cabs: T347-T356 and T357-T366 (second and third orders). They differed from the flat tops by having a high cab but were mechanically similar. The 3rd order had an altered radiator design.
 Low nose: T367-T386, T387-T396, T397-T406 and T407 to T417 (fourth to seventh orders). The fourth order introduced a new low nose that provided greater driver visibility, and a more modern generator. The sixth order introduced the newer EMD 645E engine, replacing the older EMD 567 used before.
 The H class diesel electric locomotive were part of the seventh T class order (numbered T413-T417 at delivery) but renumbered shortly after delivery.
 T413: Built in 1956 for the narrow gauge Fyansford Cement Works Railway, Geelong as D1, without marker lights and with stock EMD footplates. In 1969, it was sold to Victorian Railways, renumbered T413, converted to broad gauge and had its stock EMD footplates replaced with the standard VR ones and marker lights added.
 T414: Built in November 1956 as DE02 for BHP, was used at their Iron Knob and Whyalla Steelworks. Was not included in Morrison-Knudsen rebuild program like the rest of the class. In 2006 it was sold to SCT Logistics and rebuilt with a cab similar to those on the fourth and fifth generation Ts (controls laid out for long-end leading), and renumbered T414.

Status table

Model Railways

HO scale
Since 2005, various plastic, ready-to-run models of the T Class series of engines have been available.

Flat-top engines
Bendigo Rail Models (BRM), selling through Auscision, released a model of the first series T Class locomotive in 2013. The first release was exclusively locomotives in the VR Blue livery, with variants for the periods 1955–1957, 1957-1970 and 1970–1980, and in both weathered and clean versions. All locomotives were fitted with full-depth valences; these effectively hid components which would later be made visible with the release of the P Class engines. In late 2015, a second run of the engines was produced, this time with mostly cutaway valance types and in many more schemes.

High and low-nose engines
Austrains released the first ready-to-run plastic model of the T Class diesel locomotive in late 2005, following the successful release of their X Class range of locomotives. The original price point was $239.00 per engine. The run was announced as just Series 2 and 3 locomotives (orders 3 to 7) in VR Blue, V/Line orange and CK locomotives in AN Green. Later announcements expanded the range to include some engines in Freight Australia green, H Class engines, and in 2007, a run of West Coast Railway locomotives. The latter of these were offered at $120.00 each, partially because of an error at the design stage where the low-nose type livery sketches had accidentally been applied to CK bodies with thin steps.

In May 2007, Auscision released a series of T Class locomotives in CFCLA's blue and silver scheme, and SSR's yellow and black scheme. These were repainted Austrains models, produced at the same factory with the same tooling, but in the Auscision box with a Certificate of Authenticity confirming that each engine was one of the batch of 200 for that identity. At the time it was made clear that those two colour schemes will not be released again by any manufacturer. The engines retailed for $249.00 each.

At some point between 2007 and 2009, Austrains re-ran the T Class model, with new numbers and upgrades including metal handrails. The new run included VR Blue, Freight Australia and Great Northern. It may also have included V/Line Orange units, but with the same numbers as the first run so it is difficult to be certain.

Powerline's variant of the T Class was an entirely new model - the first for the then-new management of the company, with no parts recycled from previous models. A new mechanism was developed in India to make use of the 5 pole skew wound, twin flywheel system, and as has since become standard, the unit was fitted with all-wheel drive and all-wheel electrical pickup. RP-25 110 wheels were made standard. The units were also fitted with DCC decoders and NEM "dunny seat" couplers as standard, although Kadee metal couplers are included in every box. Each unit was also fitted with separately-applied detail parts like handrails, brake hoses and grilles, giving a much higher level of detail than previous models. The first run was to include initial releases of the VR and V/Line liveries on both body types, and high nose West Coast Railway and low nose Freight Australia schemes. An offer was made to customers, that if they paid $50 upfront, they would receive their model(s) for $198.00. As of 2015, the recommended retail price $295.00. The engines were due to be released in 2004, but production line delays caused the announcement to be pushed back to October 2004, and the final release to early 2007. Because of the parallel development and release schedules between Austrains and Powerline, the company adopted the marketing slogan, "DO NOT BUY ANY OTHER T CLASS UNTIL YOU SEE OUR T CLASS". The final product is slightly smaller in all dimensions than the Austrains units, and Powerline has claimed that all dimensions bar some valence and handrail measurements are within 0.5mm. To cover for variants, some engines were released with decals to alter pilot stripes. Valence units were also released separately, to allow purchasers to modify or replace those provided.

A second Powerline production run was hinted at in early 2006 and announced in mid 2007 with new models in new schemes. The second run also included a different electronics system because of reported reliability issues with the DCC chip in the first run. The new chip was marketed as having increased memory capacity. Advanced orders were being accepted from mid-2008, with a down-payment of $75.00 and a total purchase price of $220.00. Delivery took place in October 2009.

SDS Models 1st Release of the retooled Austrains T class due to be released in 2020 with the T2 series new tooling (T347-T356) and T-3, T-4, T-5 and H class in both VR and V/line with others coming later on. with a prepaid price of $245 for DC and $365 for DCC Sound

To date, no models of T347-T356 have been released in ready-to-run plastic, though it is possible to mix/match parts between the BRM model and the High-Nose model to achieve a workable result. Additionally, locomotive T414 ex DE02 has never been released, but may be achievable by mixing BRM and Low-Nose components.

T392 marked on order page as T393, corrected by 3 January 2005.

References

Bo-Bo locomotives
Clyde Engineering locomotives
Pacific National diesel locomotives
Railway locomotives introduced in 1955
T class
Standard gauge locomotives of Australia
Broad gauge locomotives in Australia
Diesel-electric locomotives of Australia